The Roman Catholic Diocese of Formosa is a Latin suffragan diocese in the Ecclesiastical province of Brasília in central Brazil.

Its cathedral episcopal see is Catedral Nossa Senhora da Imaculada Conceição, dedicated to Our Lady of the Immaculate Conception, in the city of Formosa, in the state of Goiás, central Brazil.

History 
 Established on March 26, 1956 as the Territorial Prelature of Formosa, on territory split off from the then Archdiocese of Goiás (at the same time demoted to a suffragan itself) and from the suppressed Territorial Prelature of São José de Alto Tocantins
 Promoted on October 16, 1979 as the Diocese of Formosa.

Statistics 
As per 2014, it pastorally serves 256,900 Catholics (73.5% of 349,500 total) on 47,604 km² in 27 parishes and 240 missions with 37 priests (diocesan), 52 lay religious (4 brothers, 48 sisters) and 14 seminarians.

Bishops 
(all Roman rite)

Ordinaries
Bishop-Prelates of Formosa 
 Victor João Herman José Tielbeek, Picpus Fathers (SS.CC.) (February 4, 1961 - October 16, 1979 see below), Titular Bishop of Tipasa in Numidia (1961.02.04 – 1978.05.26), born 1919.08.16 in the Netherlands

Suffragan Bishops of Formosa 
 Victor João Herman José Tielbeek, SS.CC. (see above October 16, 1979 - death December 24, 1997) 
 João Casimiro Wilk, Conventual Franciscans (O.F.M. Conv.) (January 28, 1998 - June 9, 2006), transferred Bishop of Anápolis (Brazil) (2004.06.09 – ...), born Poland 1951.09.18 
 Paulo Roberto Beloto (November 16, 2005 – 2013.10.23), first Brazilian incumbent; transferred Bishop of Franca (Brazil) (2013.10.23 – ...)
 José Ronaldo Ribeiro (2014.09.24 – 2018.09.12), previously Bishop of Janaúba (Brazil) (2007.06.06 – 2014.09.24); retired
 Adair José Guimarães (2019.02.27 -

Other priest of this diocese who became bishop
Dilmo Franco de Campos, appointed  Auxiliary Bishop of Anápolis, Goias in 2019

See also 
 List of Catholic dioceses in Brazil
 namesame Roman Catholic Diocese of Formosa, Argentina

Sources and external links 

 GCatholic.org
 Catholic Hierarchy
  Diocese website (Portuguese) 

Roman Catholic dioceses in Brazil
Christian organizations established in 1956
Formosa, Roman Catholic Diocese of
Roman Catholic dioceses and prelatures established in the 20th century